The following is a timeline of the history of the city of Bonn, North Rhine-Westphalia, Germany.

Prior to 19th century

 70 CE - Roman-Batavian conflict.
 359 CE - Town of the Ubii restored by the emperor Julian.
 889 CE - Settlement sacked by Norse raiders.
 1151 - Doppelkirche Schwarzrheindorf consecrated.
 13th C. - Bonn Minster (church) built.
 1318 - Minoretenkirche (church) built.
 1543 - Printing press in operation.
 1597 - Bonn becomes capital of the Electorate of Cologne.
 1627 -  (church) built.
 1673 - November: Siege of Bonn.
 1693 - Jesuiten-kirche (church) built.
 1730 - Palace built.
 1737 - Town Hall built.
 1746 - Poppelsdorf Palace built.
 1770 - Ludwig van Beethoven born in Bonn.
 1777 - Kurkölnische Akademie Bonn (academy) founded..
 1792 - Beethoven leaves Bonn for Vienna where he would stay for the rest of his life.
 1793 - N. Simrock music publisher in business.
 1794 - French took power; sanctioned by the Treaty of Lunéville.
 1800 -  becomes mayor.

19th century
 1815 - Town becomes part of Prussia per Congress of Vienna.
 1818 - Rhenish Frederic William University and Academic Art Museum established.
 1820 - Museum of Antiquities founded.
 1822 - Town becomes part of the Rhine Province.
 1841 - Society of the Friends of Antiquity founded.
 1844 -  Railway Station built; Bonn–Cologne Railway begins operating.
 1845 - Beethovenhalle (concert hall) built.
 1851 - Leopold Kaufmann becomes mayor.
 1859 - Durchmusterung astronomical survey begins at the Bonn Observatory.
 1860 - Dieckhoff residence built.
 1862 - Herz Jesu-kirche (church) built.
 1867 - Population: 63,630.
 1871 - Bonn-Beuel station opens.
 1882 - Municipal museum active.
 1884 - Railway Station rebuilt.
 1885 - Population: 35,989.
 1888 - the local newspaper General-Anzeiger was first published
 1889 - Beethoven House museum opens.
 1890 - Beethovenfest active.
 1891 - Provincial Museum of Rhenish and Roman Antiquities opens.
 1892 - Marienkirche (church) built.
 1898 - Rhine bridge built.

20th century

1900s-1940s

 1904 - Photographische Vereinigung Bonn and Amateur-Photographen-Club Bonn active (approximate date).
 1905 - Population: 81,997.
 1913 - Stollfuß Verlag (publisher) in business.
 1919 - Population: 91,410.
 1922 - Gummy bear candy invented.
 1934 - Museum Koenig (natural history museum) opens.
 1939 - Population: 101,391.
 1944
 4 May: Arbeitserziehungslager Bonn forced labour camp established.
 14 May: Arbeitserziehungslager Bonn-Bad Godesberg forced labour camp established.
 28 November: Arbeitserziehungslager Bonn forced labour camp dissolved.
 1945
 March: American forces take city.
 Allied occupation of Germany begins; North Rhine-Westphalia overseen by British forces.
 1947 - Kunstmuseum Bonn (art museum) founded.
 1949
 May: City designated capital of Federal Republic of Germany.
 Bundestag (national legislature) begins meeting in the Bundeshaus.
 Rhine bridge rebuilt.

1950s-1990s
 1950 - Cologne Bonn Airport in operation.
 Hammerschmidt Villa designated residence of the President of Germany.
 1951
  (foreign press association) formed.
 1959 - Beethovenhalle rebuilt.
 1963 - British Embassy Preparatory School founded.
 1967 - Rheinisches Landesmuseum Bonn (museum) rebuilt.
 1969
 Bad Godesberg, Beuel, and Duisdorf become part of city.
 Central Theater and Youth Theater founded.
 1970 - United Nations Volunteers headquartered in Bonn.
 1975
 Bonn Stadtbahn (public transit) begins operating; Bundesrechnungshof station opens.
 Hans Daniels becomes mayor.
 1978 - July: 4th G7 summit held.
 1979 - City hosts Bundesgartenschau (garden show).
 1980 - University of Bonn's Max Planck Institute for Mathematics established.
 1981 -Bonn Women's Museum founded.
 1982 - 10 June: NATO summit held.
 1984 - Bonn Botanical Garden reconstructed.
 1985
 Rheinisches Malermuseum (art museum) established.
 May: 11th G7 summit held.
 1986 - Heimatmuseum Beuel (museum) established.
 1989 - International Paralympic Committee headquartered in city.
1991 - Capital decision (Hauptstadtbeschluss) 
 1992 - Bundeskunsthalle (exhibit hall) inaugurated.
 1994
 Bärbel Dieckmann becomes mayor.
 Haus der Geschichte (history museum) opens.
 1995 - Deutsches Museum Bonn, and University of Bonn's Center of Advanced European Studies and Research and Center for European Integration Studies established.
 1996 - United Nations Framework Convention on Climate Change secretariat headquartered in Bonn.
 1997 - Bonn International School and Gesellschaft für Arabisches und Islamisches Recht (Society for Arab and Islamic Law) established.
 1998 - Institute for the Study of Labor founded.
 1999
 German Bundestag (legislature) relocated from Bonn to Berlin per Berlin-Bonn Act.
 Federal Court of Auditors and Federal Cartel Office relocated to Bonn.

21st century

 2001 - University of Bonn's Egyptian Museum founded.
 2002
 Post Tower and Schürmann-Bau (office building) constructed.
 UNESCO-UNEVOC International Centre for Technical and Vocational Education and Training inaugurated.
 2005 - Events of the World Youth Day 2005 were held in Bonn
 2006 - Official opening of the Bonn UN Campus by Secretary-General Kofi Annan and German Chancellor Angela Merkel
 2009
  becomes mayor.
 Student protests.

 2011 - The celebrations for the Day of German Unity take place in Bonn
 2012 - 
 2015
 Ashok-Alexander Sridharan becomes mayor
 2017
 Meeting of the ministers of Foreign Affairs of the Group of 20
 2017 United Nations Climate Change Conference (COP23) under the Presidency of the Republic of Fiji in Bonn
 2019 - University of Bonn becomes excellence university
2020 - Katja Dörner is elected new mayor

See also
 Bonn history
 List of mayors of Bonn
 
 Bonna (in Italian), settlement in the Roman province of Germania Inferior
 Timelines of other cities in the state of North Rhine-Westphalia:(de) Aachen, Cologne, Dortmund, Duisburg, Düsseldorf, Essen, Münster

References

This article incorporates information from the German Wikipedia.

Bibliography

in English

in German

External links

 
 Europeana. Items related to Bonn, various dates
 Timeline of the city archive of Bonn (in German)

 
Bonn
bonn
Years in Germany